The Landrum's Hamburger System No. 1, at 1300 S. Virginia St. in Reno, Nevada, USA, was built in 1947. It was a Moderne style building that has also been known as Chili Cheez Cafe. It was listed on the National Register of Historic Places in 1998.  Yelp has indicated that this location has closed.

References 

National Register of Historic Places in Reno, Nevada
Streamline Moderne architecture in the United States
Commercial buildings completed in 1947
Buildings and structures in Reno, Nevada
Commercial buildings on the National Register of Historic Places in Nevada
Diners on the National Register of Historic Places
Diners in the United States
1947 establishments in Nevada